Phulparas Assembly constituency is an assembly constituency in Madhubani district in the Indian state of Bihar. River Bhutahi Balan, which is one of the wildest rivers in Bihar, flowing through the heart of it.

Overview
As per Delimitation of Parliamentary and Assembly constituencies Order, 2008, No. 39  Phulparas Assembly constituency is composed of the following: Ghoghardiha community development blocks Md. Zubair Alam Pirozgarh panchayat; Mahindwar, Dharamdiha, Godhiyari, Mahathour Khurd, Siswa Barhi, Phulparas, Ramnagar gram panchayats of Phulparas CD Block; Sunder Birajit, Matras, Tardiha, Mahisham, Madhepur East, Madhepur West, Nawada, Karhara, Dara, Doalakh, Mahpatia, Basipatti, Garhgaon, Bhakrain, Bath, Bakwa, Bhargawan, Barsham, Bheja and Rohua Sangram gram panchayats of Madhepur CD Block.

Phulparas Assembly constituency is part of No. 7 Jhanjharpur (Lok Sabha constituency).

Members of Legislative Assembly

Election results

2020

References

External links
 

Assembly constituencies of Bihar
Politics of Madhubani district